Adéla Stříšková (born 14 December 2000) is a Czech handball player for DHK Baník Most and the Czech national team.

She represented the Czech Republic at the 2020 European Women's Handball Championship.

References

2000 births
Living people
Czech female handball players
Sportspeople from Most (city)